Jalan Jenderal Ahmad Yani or Jalan Jend. A. Yani is one of the main roads of Jakarta, Indonesia. The road is named after an Indonesian National Hero General Ahmad Yani. The road was built as a bypass to connect Tanjung Priok harbour with Halim Perdanakusuma Airport in 1960s. This road extends along 5.7 km from Cempaka Mas, Central Jakarta to Pisangan Baru, Matraman, East Jakarta . This road is traversed by Jakarta Inner Ring Road and TransJakarta corridor 10.
This road crosses 9 urban villages of Central Jakarta and East Jakarta, namely:
Cempaka Putih Timur, Cempaka Putih, Central Jakarta
Rawasari, Cempaka Putih, Central Jakarta
New Pisangan, Matraman, East Jakarta
Kayu Putih, Pulo Gadung, East Jakarta
Rawamangun, Pulo Gadung, East Jakarta
Utan Kayu Selatan, Matraman, East Jakarta
Utan Kayu Utara, Matraman, East Jakarta
Cinnamon, Matraman, East Jakarta
East Pisangan, Pulo Gadung, East Jakarta

Transportation
This road is passed by TransJakarta corridor 10. It is also served by APTB, Mayasari Bakti and Kopaja buses.

See also

History of Jakarta

References

Transport in Jakarta
Central Jakarta
Roads of Jakarta